The Minister of War was the leader and most senior official of the French Ministry of War. It was a position in the Government of France from 1791 to 1947, replacing the position of Secretary of State for War and later being merged with the offices of Minister of the Navy and Minister of Air to form a new Minister of the Armed Forces.

History 
In 1791, during the French Revolution, the Secretary of State for War became titled Minister of War.

For most of its existence and until the beginning of the 20th century, ministers had always been Marshals or Generals. The Third Republic saw the gradual replacement of the military by civilian politicians to the office. It was also subject to the governmental instability of the regime, leading to ministers seating only for few days.

Powers and functions 
On 27 April 1791, the National Constituent Assembly issued a decree organizing the six ministries of Justice, Interior, Finances, War, Navy and Foreign Affairs. The decree was signed into law on 25 May 1791 by King Louis XVI. This law determined the responsibilities of the minister, giving him full authority on the French Army and the sole provost duties of the National Gendarmerie. It also resolved that the minister would be responsible for the administration and finances of his department.

Officeholders

Kingdom of France

First Republic

First Empire

Restoration

Hundred Days

Kingdom of France

Second Republic

Second Empire

Third Republic

Vichy France

Free France

Provisional Government

Fourth Republic

Notes

References 

War
1791 establishments in France
1947 disestablishments in France
Former defence ministries